Adam Darrehsi may refer to:
 Adam Darrehsi-ye Olya
 Adam Darrehsi-ye Sofla